Alejandro Pakozdi is a Chilean former professional tennis player.

Pakozdi, a native of Santiago, has a brother Mario who also played tennis and became President of the Chilean Tennis Federation. Their father, Hungarian-born footballer László Pákozdi, was manager of the Chile national football team in 1957. During the 1970s, Pakozdi played collegiate tennis in the United States for Tulsa University and then Doane University. He participated at the 1974 French Open and was later a tennis pro in Puerto Rico.

References

External links
 
 

Year of birth missing (living people)
Living people
Chilean male tennis players
Tennis players from Santiago
Tulsa Golden Hurricane men's tennis players
Doane University alumni
Chilean people of Hungarian descent